The 1991 Esso RAC British Touring Car Championship season was the 34th British Touring Car Championship (BTCC) season and marked the first year of the Super Touring era.

Changes for 1991

After a transitional year in 1990, the multi-class Group A regulations was fully dropped and replaced by the new Super Touring rules that had evolved out of Group A's Div. II category. Group A cars were still allowed to participate, but only as long as they were restricted to bring them down to Super Touring speeds.

Season summary

Group A had towards the end of its existence been dominated by Ford and their Sierra RS500. Super Tourers had first appeared in 1990, and with BMW and Vauxhall running their cars in that category they effectively had a years head start on their opposition for 1991. BMW also had the numerical advantage, the factory Prodrive team entering two cars and the semi-factory Vic Lee Motorsport team entering four. Vauxhall had two cars, as had Toyota, while Ford only appeared with a single car for Robb Gravett's Trakstar team. Nissan missed the start of the season but then ran a single-car effort for Keith O'Dor driving a 2.0 Primera entered by Janspeed, and was joined by ex-Formula One driver Julian Bailey towards the end of the season and Mitsubishi was back, engineered by BTCC stalwart John McGuire Racing, fielding a one car team for Mark Hales, the team elected to run the Lancer GTI at the beginning of the season but was replaced by the larger Galant mid season

The championship battle would stand between Will Hoy and John Cleland. Hoy won the first two races of the season and kept scoring consistently, but as the season progressed it was Cleland who came out on top more often than not. Hoy's consistency however put him in a position to claim the championship at the penultimate round at Thruxton, provided he scored a good enough result. Indeed, Hoy took the lead of the race thanks to BMW team tactics, but soon thereafter he was controversially tapped into a spin by works BMW driver Jonathan Palmer. Hoy dropped down the field and later retired after contact with Cleland. Cleland would go on to finish 8th with a damaged car, taking the championship to the final race. There Hoy was able to finish ahead of Cleland, and thus claiming the first Super Touring championship win. Andy Rouse finished third for Toyota, and Steve Soper ended up fourth overall despite missing several races due to clashing commitments in the German DTM championship.

Teams and drivers

Race calendar and winners
All races were held in the United Kingdom.

 – Race was stopped after 10 laps due to heavy rain. The race was not restarted and no points were awarded.

Championship results

Drivers Championship

Note: bold signifies pole position, italics signifies fastest lap.
 – Tim Harvey was docked 48 points in round 3 for not keeping within the limits of noise regulations.
† Race was stopped early due to heavy rain, and no points were awarded.
Note: Most fastest laps are unknown.

Manufacturers Championship

1991 Season
Touring Car Championship season